
Bicocca, meaning a small castle located in an elevated place (i.e. a small rocca), is a common term in Italian toponymy, It may refer to:

Liguria
 "Collina Bicocca", a hill by Arenzano, in the Province of Genoa

Lombardy
 Bicocca (district of Milan)
 Bicocca (Milan Metro), a station)

Piedmont
 Bicocca (district of Novara)
 Colle Bicocca, a hill in the Province of Cuneo
 Strada della Bicocca, a road in San Giusto Canavese, in the Province of Turin
 Torre della Bicocca ("Bicocca Tower"), a tower in Buttigliera Alta, Province of Turin

Sicily
 Bicocca, a district of Catania

Tuscany
 Monte Bicocca, a mountain in the Province of Lucca

See also
 Battle of Bicocca, fought near Milan in 1522
 University of Milan Bicocca, informally referred to as "Bicocca", a large branch of the University of Milan
 Battle of Novara (1849) (AKA Battle of Bicocca), fought 1849
 Stazione di Catania Bicocca, a railway station of Catania